Timothy Burke (February 2, 1866December 31, 1926) was an American lawyer and Republican politician from Green Bay, Wisconsin.  He served in the State Assembly for the 1895 and 1907 sessions, and represented Brown County in the Wisconsin Senate for 16 years (1909–1925).

Biography
Burke was born on February 2, 1866, on a farm in the town of Morrison, Wisconsin. He initially worked as a teacher and farmer. He entered law school in 1897 and passed the bar exam in December that year. During the First World War he served in the Wisconsin State Guard. He died in Green Bay on December 31, 1926.

Political career
Burke was a member of the assembly from 1895 to 1896, again from 1907 to 1908. In between tenures in the assembly, he was sheriff of Brown County, Wisconsin from 1901 until 1902. He became chairman of the Brown County Republican Party in 1904 and served until 1911, and served in the senate from 1909 to 1925. After his defeat in the 1924 Republican primary by John B. Chase, (an adherent of Senator Robert M. LaFollette), he returned to practicing law.

References

People from Morrison, Wisconsin
Republican Party Wisconsin state senators
Republican Party members of the Wisconsin State Assembly
Wisconsin sheriffs
Schoolteachers from Wisconsin
Educators from Wisconsin
Wisconsin lawyers
1866 births
1926 deaths
19th-century American lawyers
20th-century American politicians
19th-century American politicians